Tillandsia cossonii is a species of flowering plant in the Bromeliaceae family. This species is endemic to Mexico.

References

cossonii
Flora of Mexico
Taxa named by John Gilbert Baker